Setodes is a genus of long-horned caddisflies in the family Leptoceridae. There are at least 230 described species in Setodes.

See also
 List of Setodes species

References

Further reading

 
 
 

Trichoptera genera
Articles created by Qbugbot
Integripalpia